The 2021 WNBL–Pilipinas season, also known as the 2021 Pia Cayetano WNBL season, is the second season of the Women's National Basketball League (WNBL) of the Philippines. It is also the first season of the WNBL as a professional league as recognized by the Games and Amusement Board of the Philippine government. The season started on July 18, 2021.

On July 29, the league announced through their Facebook page that the games were postponed due to the implementation of the highest quarantine restriction (Enhanced Community Quarantine) in Metro Manila beginning on August 6. The season resumed on September 18 after quarantine restrictions in Metro Manila eased up.

Draft

Teams
A total of five teams confirmed participation for the 2021 season 17 teams applied to join the inaugural season of the WNBL as a professional league which were screened mainly on their financial capability. Only four teams were accepted as participants for the inaugural professional season, with one more team joining the WNBL only after the conclusion of the 2021 draft, the Taguig Lady Generals.

Venue
Due to the COVID-19 pandemic in Metro Manila, the season was played in Bren Z. Guiao Convention Center in Pampanga, in a closed-circuit format, behind closed doors.

Format
The following format will be observed for the duration of the season:
 Double-round robin eliminations; 10 games per team; Teams are then seeded by basis on win–loss records.
Top four teams will advance to the semifinals.
Semifinals:
SF1: #1 vs #4 (best-of-three)
SF2: #2 vs #3 (best-of-three)
Finals (best-of-3 series)
F1: SF1 Winner vs SF2 Winner

Elimination round

Team standings

Schedule

Results

Playoffs

Semifinals

(1) Parañaque vs. (4) Quezon

(2) Taguig vs (3) Glutagence 

Glutagence have forfeited Game 3 of their semifinals series against Taguig after the league have decided to terminate the Glow Boosters' franchise for failure to settle their franchise fee.

Finals

(1) Parañaque vs (2) Taguig

See also
2021 NBL–Philippines season

References

WNBL
Basketball events postponed due to the COVID-19 pandemic
Women's National Basketball League (Philippines)